The Men is a Canadian crime comedy film, directed by Gilles Carle and released in 1971. The film centres on Jean (Donald Pilon) and Émile (René Blouin), a lumberjack and a student who have been living off the grid in the wilderness, who decide that they need a woman to join them and head into town to look for one. They resort to kidnapping Dolores (Katerine Mousseau), a prison guard who is the daughter of the village police chief, leading the villagers to mount a vigilante mob to capture Jean and Émile and bring them to justice.

The film's cast also includes Andrée Pelletier and Guy L'Écuyer.

Martin Knelman of The Globe and Mail reviewed the film favourably, writing that "At his most brilliant, Carle achieves a form of comedy that's part Rabelaisian and part Keystone Kops, but just under the surface of slapstick raucousness there's a sense of desperation, of despair on the brink of violence and defeat. This double-sighted attitude is what gives Carle's movies their peculiar comic edge and their self-propelling energy."

Reception
The film was seen by 302,950 people in France.

References

Works cited

External links
 

1971 films
1971 comedy films
Canadian crime comedy films
1970s French-language films
Films directed by Gilles Carle
French-language Canadian films
1970s Canadian films